Dinasudar is an Indian Tamil-language daily newspaper that was started in February 1964 by Dr. B. S. Mani. It primarily targeted the Tamil audience in Bengaluru, Karnataka, with circulation reaching the Krishnagiri district of Tamil Nadu. In the late 2000s it expanded to publishing from Krishnagiri, Tamil Nadu, as well.

Dr. Mani also brought out first Kannada-Evening called Sanjevani.

External links

Tamil-language newspapers published in India
Publications established in 1964
1964 establishments in Mysore State